Jean-Marie Plum (30 June 1899, in Liège – 28 March 1944, in Brussels) was a Belgian composer and organist.

Life 
Born in Liège, Plum studied philosophy at the Diocesan Seminary and later attended the music class of Lucien Mawet (1875-1947), with whom he had a brief romantic affair. He was ordered priest in 1927 and became organist  Order of Servants of Mary in Brussels. He left an important production of sacred and organ music (196 opus numbers).

Compositions

Sacred Music 
 Hymnus Septem S.S. Fundatorum, Op. 10
 Missa tertia in honorem Sancti Joannis Apostoli et Evangelistae, Op. 25
 Missa Exsultet, à 3 voix égales et orgue, Op. 70
 Missa Gloria Laus, à 2 voix mixtes, Op. 72
 Tria motecta, 1 vocis comitante organo, Op. 75
 Te Deum, pour 3 voix égales et grand orgue, Op. 82
 Messe de Pâques, pour orgue ou harmonium, Op. 89
 Missa Lauda Sion, à trois voix mixtes sans orgue, Op. 90
 Deux Motets, à 2 voix égales, Op. 91
 Messe de Noël, à 2 voix mixtes, Op. 95
 Ergo sum, motet pour Messe des défunts à une voix, orgue et violoncelle ad libitum, Op. 96
 Missa Vexilla Regis, 2 vocum aequalium cum organo, Op. 100
 Missa Pange Lingua, ad tres voces aequales, organo comitante, Op. 106
 7 Cantica Eucharistica (I. Ave Verum, II. O quam suavis,  III. O sacrum convivium, IV. Panis Angelicus,  V. O salutaris, VI. Adoro te,  VII. O Esca viatorum), Op. 107
 7 Laudes mariales (Ave Maria,  Beatam me dicent,  Recordare,  Inviolata,  Sub tuum,  Tota pulchra,  O gloriosa), Op. 112
 In honorem Coredemptricis Generis Humani: Magnificat, Op. 113
 In honorem Coredemptricis Generis Humani: Stabat Mater, Op. 114
 Ad laudes vespertinas, 4 motetta tribus vocibus aequalibus comitante organo, Op. 116
 7 Tantum ergo	 à une voix, Op. 119
 Cantique de communion, Op. 121
 Missa Crux fidelis, tribus vocibus æqualibus, comitante Organo, Op. 125
 Laudate Dominum in chordis et organo, motettum 4 vocum in-vel aequalium cum organo, Op. 132
 Pie Pellicane, Tota pulcra, ad duas voces aequales comitante organo, Op. 135
 Laudate pueri, ad duas voces aequales comitante organo, Op. 136
 Missa Alleluia, ad 4 voces mixtas sine organo, Op. 137
 Missa Ubi caritas et amor, ad 2 voces mixtas cum organo, Op. 143
 Cantique à la Vierge Marie, Op. 159
 Missa Salve Regina, à deux voix égales et orgue, Op. 160
 2.ème Salut, à 3 voix égales et orgue (I. Ave verum,  II. Sub tuum praesidium,  III. Tantum ergo,  IV. Lauda Sion), Op. 162 
 5.ème Salut, à 2 voix égales et orgue (I. Homo quidam, II. Ave Maria,  III. Tantum ergo,  IV. Laudate Dominum), Op. 163
 Missa Regina servorum tuorum, pour 3 voix égales et orgue, Op. 167
 Magnificat, Op. 172
 6. ème Salut, à 2 voix égales [et orgue] ( I. Panis angelicus, II. O quot undis, III. Tantum ergo, IV. Memorare), Op. 179
 Stabat Mater, soloists, choir, organ, Op. 192

Organ Music 
 Trois pieces pour grand orgue, Op. 30
 Fantaisie,	pour grand orgue, Op. 46
 Sursum corda, pour grand orgue, Op. 53
 Messe de mariage, trois pièces pour harmonium, Op. 56
 Toccata, pour grand orgue, Op. 59
 Lauda Sion, pour grand orgue, Op. 64
 Marche héroïque, pour grand orgue, Op. 77
 Messe breve, pour orgue ou harmonium, Op. 79
 Scherzando, pour grand orgue, Op. 81
 Pièce funèbre, pour grand orgue, Op. 83
 Etude concertante, pour le pédalier, Op. 88
 20 Sorties ou Versets, pour orgue ou harmonium, Op. 103
 20 Elévations ou communions, pour orgue ou harmonium, Op. 104
 20 Offertoires, pour orgue ou harmonium, Op. 105
 Sortie sur un thème de choral, pour grand orgue, Op. 108
 Symphonie eucharistique, pour grand orgue, Op. 115
 Clementissime Domine, pour grand orgue, Op. 124
 Procession, pour grand orgue, Op. 126
 3.ème offertoire sur trois noëls, pour orgue ou harmonium, Op. 134
 Introduction, Variations et Final sur le Stabat Mater traditionel, pour grand orgue, Op.138
 Entrée Pontificale, pour grand orgue, Op.149
 Regnavit Dominus, pour grand orgue, Op.150
 Toccata no. 2, pour grand orgue, Op.152
 Toccata no. 3 (Big-Ben), pour grand orgue, Op.154
 Triptyque, pour grand orgue, Op. 158
 Via Crucis, pour grand orgue, Op. 168
 Symphonie Nuptiale, pour grand orgue, Op. 170	
 Suite brève, pour Orgue ou Harmonium, Op. 173
 Etude concertante, pour le pédalier ou grande orgue, Op. 188
 Entrée. Improvisation sur un Cantique de Profession, pour grand orgue, Op. 196 (posthume).

Piano Music 
 Tryptique (I. Allegretto, II. Adagio, III. Allegro vivace), pour piano, Op. 78
 Roumont,	suite pittoresque pour piano, Op. 97
 Impromptu-Lied, Op. 142
 Chant pastoral	pour piano, Op. 147

References

Sources 
 Biographie de Jean-Marie Plum
 Lebrun A., ofm, Le Père Jean-Marie Plum, Bruxelles, Éditions du Chant d’Oiseau, 1945.
 Gallé P., osm, Un amant de la Beauté éternelle: le frère Jean-Marie Plum, in Monte Senario, n. 6 (settembre-dicembre 1998), pp. 34–40.

External links
 
 Andrew Pink performs Jean–Marie Plum's 'Bénédiction Nuptiale' (Messe de Mariage. Op. 58. Pub. posth.).

1899 births
1944 deaths
20th-century classical composers
20th-century organists
20th-century Belgian male musicians
Belgian classical composers
Belgian male classical composers
Belgian classical organists
Male classical organists
Musicians from Liège